The following is a list of the moths of India. It is estimated that approximately 10,000 species of moths exist in India.

Family lists for Indian moths

 Alucitidae
 Bombycidae
 Brachodidae
 Brahmaeidae
 Choreutidae
 Cosmopterigidae
 Cossidae
 Crambidae
 Depressariidae
 Drepanidae
 Elachistidae
Urodeta jurateae Sruoga & Rociene, 2018
Urodeta pectena Sruoga & Rociene, 2018
 Erebidae
 Eupterotidae
 Gelechiidae
 Geometridae
 Glyphipterigidae
 Gracillariidae
 Hepialidae
 Immidae
 Lasiocampidae
 Lecithoceridae
 Limacodidae
 Lymantriidae
 Noctuidae
 Nolidae
 Notodontidae
 Oecophoridae
 Pantheidae
 Peleopodidae
 Phaudidae
 Psychidae
 Pterophoridae
 Pyralidae
 Saturniidae
 Sesiidae
 Sphingidae
 Thyrididae
 Tineidae
 Tortricidae
 Uraniidae
 Xyloryctidae
 Yponomeutidae
 Zygaenidae

See also

 Lepidoptera
 Fauna of India
 Flora of India

References
New species of Urodeta Stainton, 1869 (Lepidoptera, Elachistidae, Elachistinae) from Ghana and Democratic Republic of the Congo, with identification keys to the Afrotropical species of the genus

 Hampson, G.F. & al (1892-1937) Fauna of British India Including Ceylon and Burma - Moths. Vols. 1-5 cxix + 2813 p - 1295 figs - 1 table - 15 pl (12 in col.)
 Kendrick, R.C., 2002 [2003]. Moths (Insecta: Lepidoptera) of Hong Kong. PhD thesis, The University of Hong Kong. xvi + 660 pp. 
 Savela, Markku. Website on Lepidoptera and some other life forms - page on order Lepidoptera (Accessed 8 July 2007).

External links

 Insects of Sri Lanka
 
 Indian Wildlife Act and scheduled species lists 
 Schedule 1
 Schedule 2

 
India
Moths of Asia
Moths